The National Center for Healthy Housing (NCHH) is a national nonprofit organization dedicated to creating safe and healthy housing for American families. Its research often provides a scientific basis for federal, state, and local policies and programs. NCHH trained nearly 45,000 individuals in healthy housing practices from 2005 through 2014. NCHH's advocacy efforts aim to ensure that health is considered in housing policy and that housing is valued as a determinant of health. Through partnerships, NCHH seeks to reduce health disparities in low-income communities and communities of color. Founded by Fannie Mae in 1992, it was originally known as the National Center for Lead-Safe Housing. NCHH's main office is based in downtown Columbia, Maryland.

With over 25 years of experience, NCHH conducts applied research, program evaluation, technical assistance, training, and outreach focused on reducing the health consequences of indoor exposures. NCHH's staff includes housing, health, and environmental professionals with expertise in biostatistics, epidemiology, environmental health, public health, housing policy, and industrial hygiene.

History

1992-2002: Formation of the National Center for Lead-Safe Housing

The Fannie Mae Foundation created the National Center for Lead-Safe Housing (as it was known at the time) in October 1992, using a $5.2 million donation from its outgoing president, David Maxwell. At the time, the grant was the Fannie Mae Foundation’s largest-ever gift. The purpose of the gift was to create a nonprofit organization that would represent, with the Alliance for Healthy Homes (a District of Columbia-based nonprofit organization) and the Enterprise Foundation serving as parent organizations, the first national joint venture between affordable housing and environmental public health advocates.

Walter G. "Nick" Farr, a vice president of the Enterprise Foundation, was asked to lead the new nonprofit. Joining Farr as the deputy director at the fledgling organization was Dr. David Jacobs, a technical expert on lead-based paint safety. Prior to joining the National Center for Lead-Safe Housing, Dr. Jacobs had been a faculty research scientist at the Georgia Institute of Technology. The two men assembled a team of researchers, housing professionals, advocates, and others to chart the nation's path to primary prevention of childhood lead poisoning.

Over the next few years, the Department of Housing and Urban Development (HUD) challenged the center to compose a definitive source of national technical guidelines for dealing with lead-based paint, the Centers for Disease Control and Prevention (CDC) asked the center to develop robust scientific studies in order to understand sources and pathways of lead exposure, and the Environmental Protection Agency requested research to assess the hazards of lead-contaminated dust. Cushing Dolbeare, a preeminent affordable housing advocate and board member of both the new center and the Alliance for Healthy Homes, chaired a congressionally chartered task force in 1995 with a vision for making the nation’s housing stock lead-safe, demanding changes in state and local laws, regulations, and ordinances.

In 2001, the center was one of the first to recognize publicly that homes with lead paint problems typically posed several other health threats as well; they argued that addressing these hazards separately was both ineffective and inefficient.

Recognizing the need and their capability to address more home hazards than lead-based paint, the board of directors opted to change the organization’s name from the National Center for Lead-Safe Housing to the National Center for Healthy Housing (NCHH) in 2001. The larger scale inferred by the change of the organization’s name allowed NCHH to expand the scope of its mission significantly; it would now focus not only on lead, still a major priority, but also other housing-related health hazards and causes, such as asthma, mold, and integrated pest management. Still, NCHH’s core values and priorities remained unchanged: to find proven, practical, and cost-effective ways of protecting families from home health hazards, especially those at highest risk in older, low-income homes.

Nick Farr retired from the organization in 2001 but remained in touch with his friends and colleagues at NCHH until his passing on May 27, 2014.

2002-2014: Rebecca Morley Becomes NCHH's Second Executive Director; Formation of Healthy Housing Solutions

In July 2002, Nick Farr's replacement as executive director came in the form of Rebecca Morley, MSPP, who had worked previously as a senior associate at ICF Consulting in Washington, DC. At ICF, Ms. Morley had advised clients, including federal agencies, on lead poisoning prevention. Under Ms. Morley’s stewardship, the center continued to grow and flourish.

NCHH established a subsidiary for-profit organization in September 2003. Christened Healthy Housing Solutions, the subsidiary was created to assist governmental and nongovernmental clients in developing, managing, and evaluating projects supporting the creation of healthier homes for all Americans. The subsidiary officially began operations on November 14, 2003, with Jackson Anderson serving as its president, and would pursue government grants for which NCHH was ineligible.

The EPA promulgated the Renovation, Repair, and Training (RRP) Rule in April 2008. The RRP Rule went into effect on April 22, 2010; one of its requirements was that any contractor engaged to perform home renovations for money must complete an eight-hour training course in lead-safe work practices and pass an exam. As lead-safety experts who had often offered advice on the topic to the EPA over the years, NCHH began a national training initiative in August 2009 with the goal of ensuring that lead safety courses would be available to contractors nearly everywhere that there was a demand for them. NCHH assembled a network of over one hundred trainers across the country to teach RRP compliance, ultimately training approximately 27,500 contractors across forty states, plus the U.S. territory of Guam. While the RRP Rule is still in effect, NCHH did not seek to renew its training certification with the EPA when it expired in 2013 and no longer offers RRP certification courses.

In January 2010, NCHH and the Alliance for Healthy Homes, a national nonprofit with a similar focus, announced a merger. As a result of the merger, NCHH assumed control of the Alliance for Healthy Homes' assets and staff.  
 
Executive Director Rebecca Morley announced her resignation from NCHH in October 2014, effective December 2. NCHH's board asked deputy director Jonathan Wilson to serve as acting director until Morley's permanent replacement was selected.

2015-2017: Nancy Eldridge Becomes NCHH's Third Executive Director; Formation of the Well-Home Network

Nancy Rockett Eldridge was announced as NCHH's third executive director on May 28, 2015. Since 1999, Eldridge had served as CEO for Cathedral Square, a Burlington, VT-based nonprofit specializing in healthy home environments for older adults. Under her leadership, Cathedral Square increased the number of affordable housing communities to 28. Ms. Eldridge's service as NCHH's executive director began on August 5, 2015. Eldridge's interest in creating healthy housing for older adults resulted in the formation of the Well-Home Network.

2017-Forward: Amanda Reddy Becomes NCHH's Fourth Executive Director

Amanda Reddy was announced as NCHH's fourth executive director on May 17, 2017. Reddy originally joined NCHH's subsidiary, Healthy Housing Solutions, in 2012 but moved from that organization over to NCHH the following year.

Healthy Housing Solutions

In September 2003, NCHH’s board of directors voted to establish a wholly owned for-profit subsidiary, Healthy Housing Solutions, Inc ("Solutions"). The subsidiary was created to pursue federal small business set-aside contracts for which NCHH, as a 501(c)(3) nonprofit organization, would be ineligible. Therefore, Solutions’ successful efforts to secure these federal contracts, and other state and local agency contracts, would directly benefit NCHH and support its mission. Solutions officially began operations on November 14, 2003, with Jackson Anderson Jr., then a senior staff member at NCHH, named as its president/CEO. As the sole shareholder, NCHH appoints Solutions' six-member board of directors.

Solutions provide public agencies and private sector organizations with professional services related to residential environmental health and safety (including applied field research and evaluation), program evaluation and analysis, policy and regulatory support, creation of technical guidance documents and white papers, development, and management of technical training programs, review and analysis of peer review literature and scientific documents, convening technical advisory review panels, logistical and technical support for conferences and seminars, and strategic planning services. Many of Solutions’ current and past projects address children’s health concerns, initiatives, and issues, including primary prevention approaches and programs.

Since its founding by NCHH, Solutions has performed a variety of assignments, primarily under four federal multiyear task order-type indefinite delivery/indefinite quantity (IDIQ) contracts in which multiple and varied projects have been awarded. Three of these contracts have been with the U.S. Department of Housing and Urban Development’s Office of Lead Hazard Control and Healthy Homes (HUD OLHCHH), and one contract has been with the U.S. Centers for Disease Control and Prevention’s Lead Poisoning Prevention and Healthy Homes Office.

List of selected accomplishments

2017

The Journal of Public Health Management & Practice publishes three articles jointly written by NCHH and the New York State Department of Health (NYSDOH) summarizing the health and cost benefits of NYSDOH's Healthy Neighborhoods Program (HNP).

2014

NCHH is selected by the World Health Organization (WHO) to be the first WHO Collaborating Centre for healthy housing research and training in the United States. WHO Collaborating Centres are institutions designated to undertake activities in support of the WHO's programs.

Rebecca Morley, then-executive director, was selected for NeighborWorks America's Achieving Excellence Program.

NCHH and American Public Health Association (APHA) jointly release the National Healthy Housing Standard. The cities of Tukwila, Washington, and Dallas, TX, have adopted many of the Standard's recommendations into their respective municipal codes.

NCHH, in concert with the King County Housing Authority (KCHA) and Public Health-Seattle and King County, complete a study demonstrating that a combination of weatherization and healthy homes interventions with in-home asthma education from community health workers (CHW) improves childhood asthma control.

2013

Conducted Maryland's first health impact assessment (HIA) of an intermodal freight project, funded by the Health Impact Project, recommending against siting the intermodal facility in Baltimore's Morrell Park neighborhood.

Released results of updated State of Healthy Housing project, a comprehensive report ranking housing conditions in 44 major metropolitan areas nationally, showing a critical need to improve housing conditions in many U.S. cities.

Launched the Healthy Housing Challenge project (in collaboration with Rebuilding Together) with funding from the Wells Fargo Foundation.

Hosted a healthy homes conference in Washington, DC, in honor of its 20th anniversary.

2012

Published "Window Replacement and Residential Lead Paint Hazard Control 12 Years Later" in the Environmental Research journal, January 2012.

NCHH and its network of training partners trained more than 2,600 people through its National Healthy Homes Training Center.

2011

Created the Grassroots Advocacy Network, which supports healthy housing advocacy at the state and local levels.

Published findings from a study on the health impacts of a green and healthy housing rehab in Minnesota in Public Health Reports in May 2011.

2010

Published Healthy and Safe Homes: Research, Practice, and Policy (edited by NCHH's Rebecca Morley, Angela Mickalide, and Karin Mack), a book about housing conditions and solutions to improve public health.

Launched a new suite of online training and informational resources to help affordable housing professionals adopt sustainable and healthy building practices.

Achieved several legislative milestones that include sections of Senator Jack Reed's (D-RI) healthy housing bills, the Code Administration Grant Act, and the Senate-Committee-passed Livable Communities Act.

Combined forces with the Alliance for Healthy Homes to advance healthy homes and communities.

Fought efforts to roll back the Environmental Protection Agency's (EPA) Renovation, Repair, and Painting (RRP) rule.

2009

Created the National Safe and Healthy Housing Coalition, composed of leading nonprofit and agency advocates in affordable housing, public health, environment, and energy efficiency.

Released results of the State of Healthy Housing, a comprehensive report ranking housing conditions in 45 major metropolitan areas across the nation, showing a critical need to improve housing conditions in many U.S. cities.

Launched a national lead-safe work practices training network in response to the Environmental Protection Agency's (EPA) Renovation, Repair, and Painting (RRP) rule. As of August 2013, more than 27,500 people were trained.

Hosted the first National Summit on Healthy Housing Policy and convened with 40 leading nonprofit partners to set a national action plan to achieve healthier housing in the United States.

Completed the first scientific review of healthy home interventions with the Centers for Disease Control and Prevention (CDC) and published results in the report Housing Interventions and Health: A Review of the Evidence.

References

External links 
 Official website
 Healthy Housing Solutions
 Rebuilding Together

Charities based in Maryland
Columbia, Maryland
Housing organizations in the United States
Lead
Organizations established in 1992
Pollution in the United States